The Archdeacon of Blackburn is a senior ecclesiastical officer within the Diocese of Blackburn. Originally created on 17 August 1877 within the Diocese of Manchester, the office became a part of the new Diocese of Blackburn upon its creation on 12 November 1926.

As archdeacon she or he is responsible for the disciplinary supervision of the clergy within the seven area deaneries: Accrington, Blackburn with Darwen, Burnley, Chorley, Leyland, Pendle and Whalley.

List of archdeacons
1877–1885 (res.): Edward Birch (–1886; first Archdeacon) 
1885–1899 (res.): Robert Rawstorne
1900–1901 (d.): Francis Cramer-Roberts, Vicar of Blackburn and assistant bishop
1901–1916 (d.): Robert Fletcher
1916–1920 (res.): Willoughby Allen
1920–1921 (d.): Edward Richardson
1922–1936 (d.): Atherton Rawstorne, Bishop suffragan of Whalley
The archdeaconry was transferred from the diocese of Manchester to the newly created diocese of Blackburn by Order-in-Council on 12 November 1926.
1936–1936 (res.): Henry Fosbrooke
1936–1946 (ret.): Richard Newman
1946–1959 (res.): Charles Lambert
1959–1962 (d.): Arnold Picton
1962–1973 (d.): Norman Hodd
1973–1986 (ret.): Desmond Carroll (afterwards archdeacon emeritus)
1986–1996 (ret.): David Robinson (afterwards archdeacon emeritus)
1996–September 2001 (res.): John Marsh
2002–31 July 2015 (ret.): John Hawley
31 July–aft. September 2015 (Acting): Roger Smith
bef. November 2015–February 2016 (Acting): Timothy Lipscomb
14 February 2016–present: Mark Ireland
13 April 20175 February 2018 (ret.): Sue Penfold, Temporary Assistant Archdeacon and Director of Discipleship and Ministry
1 July 2018 onwards (announced): Grant Ashton, Temporary Assistant Archdeacon

References

Anglican ecclesiastical offices
Lists of Anglicans
Lists of English people
Lancashire-related lists